Tozurahara Dam is an earthfill dam located in Chiba Prefecture in Japan. The dam is used for irrigation. The catchment area of the dam is 15 km2. The dam impounds about 45  ha of land when full and can store 4350 thousand cubic meters of water. The construction of the dam was started on 1970 and completed in 1978.

References

Dams in Chiba Prefecture
1978 establishments in Japan